The 2015 Las Vegas Bowl was a post-season American college football bowl game played on December 19, 2015, at Sam Boyd Stadium in the Las Vegas suburb of Whitney, Nevada.  The 24th edition of the Las Vegas Bowl featured the BYU Cougars against the Utah Utes, earning the game the moniker the Holy War in Sin City (named for the "Holy War" rivalry game and the "Sin City" nickname for Las Vegas). The game sold out 24 hours after the matchup was announced. It began at 12:30 p.m. PST and aired on ABC.  It was one of the 2015–16 bowl games that concluded the 2015 FBS football season.  Sponsored by lubricant manufacturer Royal Purple, it was officially known as the Royal Purple Las Vegas Bowl.

Teams 
The game featured the BYU Cougars against their state rival, the Utah Utes.  It was the 96th meeting in their Holy War rivalry, with Utah leading the series 57–34–4 entering the game.  Their previous meeting was in 2013, when the Utes defeated the Cougars 20–13 in Provo. In addition to determining the Las Vegas Bowl Champion, the game decided the 2015 Beehive Boot champion. The game cut short a scheduled hiatus in the rivalry; the teams had not played in the 2014 or 2015 regular seasons, but would resume doing so in 2016.

BYU Cougars 

After finishing their regular season with a 9–3 record, bowl director John Saccenti extended an invitation for the Cougars to play in the game, which they accepted.

This was the Cougars' sixth Las Vegas Bowl, extending their record for most appearances in the game.  So far, the Cougars are 3–2 in the Las Vegas Bowl, having appeared in five consecutive games from 2005 until 2009.

It was the final game at BYU for head coach Bronco Mendenhall, who accepted the same position with the Virginia Cavaliers on December 4, and for assistant coaches Robert Anae, Garett Tujague, Mark Atuaia, Jason Beck, Nick Howell, and Kelly Poppinga, who accepted positions on Virginia's new coaching staff.

During the postgame interviews, Tom Holmoe stepped in during one segment and announced that Kalani Sitake had been officially hired to be the new head coach of BYU.

Utah Utes 

The Utes had started the season with 6 straight victories, rising to as high as #3 in the Playoff rankings. However a loss to USC derailed hopes for a playoff bid and conference championship. They lost two of their next five games and finished as co-champions of the South Division. They did not play in the Conference Championship due to their loss to USC. Also, they won the previous year's Las Vegas Bowl, defeating former conference mates Colorado State 45–10.

On December 6, it was announced that the Utes were invited to the Las Vegas Bowl. This was their fifth overall Las Vegas Bowl appearance. The Utes posted a 3–1 record overall in the Las Vegas Bowl entering this game.

Game summary

Scoring summary 

Source:

Statistics

References 

Las Vegas Bowl
Las Vegas Bowl
BYU Cougars football bowl games
Utah Utes football bowl games
Las Vegas Bowl
December 2015 sports events in the United States